Michal Bezpalec (born 19 August 1996) is a Czech footballer who currently plays for FC Silon Táborsko.

Career
He scored his first Czech First League goal in a 2–1 win against Bohemians 1905 in March 2017.

Career statistics

References

External links
 
 

1996 births
Living people
Czech footballers
Czech expatriate footballers
Association football midfielders
FK Dukla Prague players
Czech First League players
Ekstraklasa players
I liga players
Czech Republic youth international footballers
Czech Republic under-21 international footballers
Expatriate footballers in Poland
Czech expatriate sportspeople in Poland
Bruk-Bet Termalica Nieciecza players
FC Silon Táborsko players
People from Strakonice
Sportspeople from the South Bohemian Region